The Chairman and Vice Chairman of the Workers’ Party of Korea (WPK) were offices that existed within the WPK between 1949–66 and 2016–21. The office of "Chairman of the Central Committee" existed between 1949–66 and the office of "Chairman of the Workers' Party of Korea" existed in 2016–21. The deputy to the Chairman, the officeholder of Vice Chairman of the Central Committee existed in 1949–66 and 2016–21. This list also includes the chairmen and vice chairmen of the direct predecessors of the WPK.

Title history

Chairmen

Vice chairmen

References

Footnotes

Bibliography